Amelia Anne Kyambadde (born 30 June 1955) is a Ugandan Entrepreneur, Philanthropist, Politician, Eco-tourism enthusiast, Real Estate Developer, Trade Consultant and an advocate for the empowerment of women. She served as Minister for Trade, Industry and Cooperatives (10 years) and a Member of Parliament for Mawokota North County (10 Years) from 2011 to 2021. Since July 2021, Amelia Kyambadde has been serving as the Senior Presidential Advisor on Industry to the President of the Republic of Uganda. She sits on the boards of several private companies including Fresh Handling Ltd – a major exporter of fresh commodities, Hexagon Global Ltd – an apex body for trading and real estate, Ensulo Haven (U) Ltd – an aquaculture and tourism project.  She is a woman of integrity and valor; interpersonal skills; Pan-Africanist and a strong advocate for vulnerable groups/ women's rights.

Background
Amelia was born in June 1955 in Guildford, Surrey, United Kingdom and relocated to the then Uganda Protectorate, in 1959.

Education

 Master of Business Administration (MBA), from the American InterContinental University, United Kingdom. 

 Bachelor of Business Administration (BBA), from Makerere University, Uganda. 
 Higher Diploma in Administration, New College Durham, Durham University, United Kingdom.
 Secretarial Training, New Era Secretarial College, Nairobi. 
 Swedish Language, Arbetsfoermedlingen, Sweden.
 Office Management Course in Swedish, Arbetsfoermedlingen.

Work experience

 Senior Presidential Advisor/ Industry.  ( July 2021 - To date)
 Chairperson, Sub-Committee for Trade and Transport, National Taskforce on Covid-19. ( March 2020 - June 2021)
 Minister of Trade, Industry and Cooperatives.   (March 2011 - June 2021)
 Member of Parliament, Mawokota North  (March 2011 - May 2021)
 Chair - Forum for African Ministers of Trade, Africa Continental Free Trade Area (AfCFTA). (June 2018 - June 2019)
 Chief Negotiator of the African Continental Free Trade Area (AfCFTA) (2018 - June 2019)
 Chair - Least Developed Countries, World Trade Organization (2014)
 Chair - Sectoral Council of Ministers of Trade - East Africa Community (2014 - 2015)
 Chairperson - Council of Ministers of Trade (COMESA) (2013 - 2014)
 National Treasurer, National Resistance Movement (NRM). (2010 - 2015)
 Chairperson, National Resistance Movement Party ( 2010 - 2015)
 Principal Private Secretary (Chef de staff)  to H.E the President of the Republic of Uganda (2005 - 2010) 
 Senior Private Secretary (Administration), State House Uganda. (2000 - 2004)
 Principal Personal Secretary to H.E the President of the Republic of Uganda. (1991 - 1999)
 Senior Personal Secretary to H.E the President of the Republic of Uganda (1986 - 1991)
 Worked in Sweden while living there as a Political refugee from 1981 - 1986. 

 Joined Ugandan Civil Service as a Secretary to the Minister of Defence in 1979. 
 Worked for Kulubya & Company Advocates as a Secretary in 1978.
Philanthropic Work.

Amelia has an NGO - Twezimbe Development Foundation to uplift the standards of vulnerable persons in Uganda. 

Entrepreneurial Work.

CEO of Ensulo Haven.

Board Member - Fresh Handling Holdings Ltd. 

CEO of Hexagon Global Ltd.

Real Estate Developer.

Personal details
Amelia Anne Kyambadde is married to Wilson Kyambadde since 1976 and they have children and grandchildren.

See also
Cabinet of Uganda
Parliament of Uganda
List of members of the tenth Parliament of Uganda

References

External links
 Full of List of Ugandan Cabinet Ministers May 2011
Website of the Parliament of Uganda
https://twitter.com/akyambadde?lang=en

Living people
1955 births
Government ministers of Uganda
Members of the Parliament of Uganda
National Resistance Movement politicians
People from Mpigi District
People from Kampala
People from Guildford
Makerere University alumni
Women government ministers of Uganda
Women members of the Parliament of Uganda
21st-century Ugandan politicians
21st-century Ugandan women politicians
Trade ministers of Uganda